Forteyops is a genus of trilobites in the order Phacopida, that existed during the lower Ordovician in what is now the United States. It was described by Pribyl and Vanek in 1985, and the type species is Forteyops sexapugia, which was originally described under the genus Kawina by Ross in 1951. The type locality was the Garden City Formation in Utah.

References

External links
 Forteyops at the Paleobiology Database

Phacopida genera
Fossil taxa described in 1985
Ordovician trilobites
Fossils of the United States
Cheiruridae
Ordovician trilobites of North America